Now That April’s Here is a 1958 English-Canadian feature from William Davidson and Norman Knelman based on short stories by Morley Callaghan.

Synopsis
An early English-Canadian movie shot on the streets of Toronto, Ontario in 1957 and one of the first Canadian feature films to be produced outside of Quebec. Producers William Davidson and Norman Klenman chose as their source a collection of short stories by Morley Callaghan that had been written in the 1930s known as Now That April’s Here (curiously the four they selected to film did not include the title story: ‘Silk Stockings,’ ‘Rocking Chair,’ ‘The Rejected One’ and ‘A Sick Call’). The screenplay was written specifically as a feature, not as a series of short television dramas, with a common Toronto locale, and the filmmakers got the tacit support of producer/exhibitor Nat Taylor. It was released with some fanfare in the summer of 1958.

Raymond Massey provided the voice-over narration linking the four stories; however, the film was dismissed by Variety for its ‘amateurish production and acting values’ and it died at the box office.

References

External links
 

1958 films
Films shot in Toronto
Films set in Toronto
Canadian drama films
Films based on short fiction
1958 drama films
English-language Canadian films
1950s English-language films
1950s Canadian films